Omicron Serpentis (ο Ser, ο Serpentis) is a solitary star in the Serpens Cauda (tail) section of the equatorial constellation Serpens. Based upon an annual parallax shift of 18.83 mas as seen from Earth, it is located around 173 light years from the Sun. The star is visible to the naked eye with a base apparent visual magnitude of +4.26.

This is a white-hued A-type main sequence star with a stellar classification of A2 Va. It is located on the lower instability strip and is classified as a Delta Scuti type variable star. The apparent magnitude of the star varies in the range 4.26−4.27 with a period of 76 minutes, or 0.053 days.

The star has an estimated 2.13 times the mass of the Sun and about 2.2 times the Sun's radius. It is about half a billion years old and is spinning with a projected rotational velocity of  112.6 km/s. Omicron Serpentis is radiating 42.6 times the solar luminosity from its photosphere at an effective temperature of 8,972 K.

In 1909, the symbiotic nova RT Serpentis appeared near Omicron, although it only reached a maximum magnitude of 10.

References

A-type main-sequence stars
Delta Scuti variables
Serpens (constellation)
Serpentis, Omicron
Serpentis, 56
160613
086565
6581
Durchmusterung objects